Chlosyne ehrenbergii, the white-rayed checkerspot, white-rayed patch or Ehrenberg's patch, is a butterfly of the family Nymphalidae. It is found in Mexico.

Adult females are highly gregarious, clustering together in groups on Buddleia bushes. Adults feed on flower nectar of various flowers, including daisies and other Asteraceae species.

The larvae feed on Buddleia species.

References

External links

ehrenbergi
Butterflies of North America
Endemic Lepidoptera of Mexico